Maihpit is a village in Hsi Hseng Township, Taunggyi District, in the Shan State of eastern Burma.  It is located southwest of Nawnghkathpa and Loisawn. It is a primarily agricultural village with extensive fields surrounding it.

References

External links
Maplandia World Gazetteer

Populated places in Taunggyi District
Hsi Hseng Township